Hamlin is a town in Monroe County, New York, United States.  The population was 9,045 at the 2010 census.

The Town of Hamlin is in the northwestern part of the county and is the second largest town in area in the county.

History 
The Town of Hamlin was created as the "Town of Union," but was renamed in 1861 as the Town of Hamlin in honor of Abraham Lincoln's first vice president Hannibal Hamlin.

Hamlin was initially a part of the town of Northampton. The town of Murray split from Northampton in 1807, and split again into Union and Clarkson on December 14, 1852.

The North Star School District No. 11 was listed on the National Register of Historic Places in 2014.

Geography

The northern boundary is Lake Ontario and the western town line is the border of Orleans County, marked by New York State Route 272 (Monroe Orleans County Line Rd). The south town line borders the town of Clarkson, marked by Clarkson Hamlin Town Line Road that intersects Lake Road (New York State Route 19) south of Hamlin village. The eastern town line borders the town of Parma, marked by Hamlin-Parma Townline Road.

The Lake Ontario State Parkway passes across the north part of the town.

Demographics

As of the census of 2000, there were 9,355 people, 3,255 households, and 2,532 families residing in the town.  The population density was 215.5 people per square mile (83.2/km2).  There were 3,503 housing units at an average density of 80.7 per square mile (31.2/km2).  The racial makeup of the town was 96.78% White, 1.09% African American, 0.35% Native American, 0.32% Asian, 0.01% Pacific Islander, 0.68% from other races, and 0.76% from two or more races. Hispanic or Latino of any race were 1.60% of the population.

There was a myth that Hamlin's name was derived from that of the German city of Hamelin, this due to the fact that many residents in or near the hamlet of Hamlin were descended from German immigrants who had arrived during the late 1800s and settled in that part of the town. This had coincided with the town's renaming from Union in 1861.

There were 3,255 households, out of which 43.4% had children under the age of 18 living with them, 63.7% were married couples living together, 9.6% had a female householder with no husband present, and 22.2% were non-families. 17.4% of all households were made up of individuals, and 5.9% had someone living alone who was 65 years of age or older.  The average household size was 2.86 and the average family size was 3.24.

In the town, the population was spread out, with 30.8% under the age of 18, 8.1% from 18 to 24, 31.5% from 25 to 44, 23.0% from 45 to 64, and 6.5% who were 65 years of age or older.  The median age was 34 years. For every 100 females, there were 98.5 males.  For every 100 females age 18 and over, there were 97.0 males.

The median income for a household in the town was $49,987, and the median income for a family was $55,020. Males had a median income of $39,722 versus $24,698 for females. The per capita income for the town was $18,978.  About 4.7% of families and 6.0% of the population were below the poverty line, including 6.4% of those under age 18 and 1.7% of those age 65 or over.

Government

The town is governed by an elected Town Board consisting of the Town Supervisor and four Councilpersons. Support Boards include:
Planning Board
Zoning Board of Appeals
Conservation Board

Communities and locations in Hamlin
Benedict Beach – A beachside hamlet on Lake Ontario.
Bluff Beach – A location in the northwest part of the town near Troutburg.
Brockport Yacht Club-- Located on the South Shore of Lake Ontario, near the mouth of Sandy Creek, it is primarily a sailing club.
Hamlin – the hamlet (and census-designated place) of Hamlin on Route 19.
Hamlin Beach State Park – A state park on the shore of Lake Ontario in the northwest part of the town.
Hamlin Recreation Area – A park south of Hamlin village.
Huntington Park – A location south of Hamlin village and near the south town line.
Kendall Mills – A hamlet on the west town line.
Morton – A hamlet at the west town line on Route 272.
Onteo Beach – A beachside hamlet on Lake Ontario.
Sandy Harbor Beach – A beachside hamlet on Lake Ontario.
Shore Acres – A beachside hamlet on Lake Ontario.
Troutburg – A beachside hamlet by Lake Ontario and the Lake Ontario State Parkway in the northwest corner of the town.  It is at the west end of Hamlin Beach State Park.
Walker – A hamlet in the southeast part of the town on Route 260.

References

External links
 Town of Hamlin, NY webpage

Rochester metropolitan area, New York
Towns in Monroe County, New York
1852 establishments in New York (state)
Populated places established in 1852